Doge or DOGE may refer to:
 Doge, a historical Italian chief of state, specifically:
 Doge of Venice
 Doge of Genoa
 Doge (meme), an Internet meme primarily associated with the Shiba Inu breed of dog
 Dogecoin, a cryptocurrency named after the meme
 Döge, a village in north-east Hungary
 DOGE (database) (in French, Documentation en Gestion des Entreprises), an academic bibliographic database
 Elphias Doge, a character from the Harry Potter series

See also 
 Dodge (disambiguation)